Adenostyles alpina is herbaceous perennial plant belonging to the genus Adenostyles of the family Asteraceae.

Description

The inflorescence consists of dense corymbs hold by hairy peduncles. The small heads are usually composed of 3 to 4 flowers. The receptacle (the part that collects and maintains individual flowers) is naked or hairless. The flowers are of a tubular type and hermaphroditic. The corolla is cylindrical and pink violet. The length of the flower is of 7–8 mm. The period of flowering is from June until August.

Basal leaves are large, kidney-shaped, leaf margin is toothed. The leaves are glabrous on both sides. Size of leaves at the base: width , length .  Cauline leaves are arranged in alternating fashion with successively smaller size and are petiolated. Size of lower cauline leaves: width , length .

Distribution and habitat
The area of origin of the species is considered the mountainous southern Europe. The preferred habitat of this species are moist and shady places.

References
 Sandro Pignatti - Flora d'Italia – Edagricole, pag. 15
 Flora europaea

External links
 
 Biolib
 Adenostyles glabra

Senecioneae
Flora of Italy
Plants described in 1753
Taxa named by Carl Linnaeus